Ouargla or Warqla is a province (wilaya) in eastern Algeria. Its capital is Ouargla. Other localities include Hassi Ben Abdellah and Hassi Messaoud. It contains the Issaouane Erg desert.

History
In the past Ouargla was the center of trading of gold and slaves, as well as being an important center of Ibadi Islam. However, the Ibadis have left for the M'zab valley.

In 1984 Illizi Province was carved out of its territory.

In 2019, Touggourt Province was carved out of its territory.

Administrative divisions
The province is divided into 6 districts (daïras), which are further divided into 10 communes or municipalities.

Districts

Geology
The region lies within the Algerian Triassic Sedimentary basin containing numerous oil and gas fields, including the Alrar gas field.  Production is from Triassic sandstones with Andesitic seals and the Gothlandian shale as a source rock.  Major fields include the Hassi R'Mel gas field, Haoud-Berkaolu, Ben-Kahla, and the Guellala.

References

 
Provinces of Algeria
States and territories established in 1974